The Dirty Picture is a 2011 Indian Hindi-language biographical musical drama film inspired by the life of Silk Smitha, an Indian actress noted for her erotic roles. The filmmakers have clarified that the story is not officially or literally based on Smitha alone, but on many of her contemporaries such as Disco Shanti. It also resembles the personal lives of other women in popular culture, including actress and sex symbol Marilyn Monroe. The film was directed by Milan Luthria and co-produced by Shobha Kapoor and Ekta Kapoor, after Ekta came up with the idea and asked screenwriter Rajat Aroraa to pen a story based on it.

Vidya Balan, Emraan Hashmi, Naseeruddin Shah and Tusshar Kapoor star in lead roles. Upon release, it was a critical and commercial success, with Balan's performance receiving widespread critical acclaim and numerous accolades; she was called "the hero of the film". In addition, the film has received high praise for portraying women as powerful, contributing something unique to a typically male-dominated society. The film's soundtrack, composed by Vishal–Shekhar with lyrics written by Rajat Aroraa, also became a commercial success with the song "Ooh La La" become one of the chartbusters of the year.

The Dirty Picture grossed  at the box office, with Box Office India declaring it a "hit" after its fourth week. Balan won the National Film Award for Best Actress at the 59th National Film Awards for her performance in the film. At the 57th Filmfare Awards, The Dirty Picture received 6 nominations, including Best Film, Best Director (Luthria) and Best Supporting Actor (Shah), and won 3 awards, including Best Actress (Balan).  Additionally, at the 17th Screen Awards, it received 10 nominations and won 6 awards, including Best Film, Best Director (Luthria) and Best Actress (Balan).

Plot 
The film begins with a young girl climbing up a ladder to reach her house's roof so as to see the city's colourful world. But her mother stops her from doing so. She also tells her that dreams do not always come true and can shatter in any way. The young girl refuses to come down the ladder, which causes her mother to shake the ladder to make her come down. The young child asks her mother will she make her own child fall down. She answers that since she is the mother, she will tend to her even if she falls down, but if you go in search of your city dreams, there will be nobody to tend to you if you fall down. But the girl insists on not coming down the ladder. Her mother continues to shake the ladder, and the young girl later falls down. Then the film transitions to the future, revealing that her name is Reshma.

A day before her marriage, Reshma, a young girl runs away from her rural village and reaches Madras, hoping to become a movie star. She starts staying at a house located at a poor area near an estranged woman Ratnamma whom she affectionately calls her mother. Though she goes on auditioning for roles, she fails to land an opportunity. A casting director insults her for being unattractive and unable to act, and gives her money for food seeing her starving condition. She instead chooses to go to a movie theatre to watch her childhood idol Suryakanth in action. There, a man offers her 20 rupees to sleep with him. Though she storms out of the theatre in tears, she later ponders over and determined to secure a role, visits the sets again. She spontaneously auditions for the position of a background dancer. However, she dances in a sultry manner, using erotic movements which the assistant director found attractive. But when the film's director, Abraham comes back to the set that day and sees the dance footage, he is extremely annoyed seeing her erotic dance. He edits out Reshma's entire dance sequence. Reshma and Ratnamma eagerly goes to watch the movie but are crestfallen to see her dance has not been featured in the film. The film fails at the box office, much to the dismay of the producer Selva Ganesh, who later recalls Reshma's performance footage and includes that song in re-release at B and C centres. The film goes on to attract large crowds due to Reshma's dance moves. Just as Reshma, disheartened that her song was edited out, decides to pack up and go back to her village, producer Selva Ganesh finds her dwelling place and offers her a role in a song in his upcoming film. Selva also suggests that she now be referred to as "Silk", which is more exotic and captivating.

At the first shoot, Silk dances with actor Suryakanth, her childhood idol. Enamored with him, Silk gains his affection and attention by offering a long-term sexual relationship. Meanwhile, Abraham proposes a new film to Selva Ganesh and is keen to cast Suryakanth. However, Suryakanth's suggestion of adding sex and eroticism, to make the film more commercially viable, angers Abraham. Silk slowly builds a name for herself in the industry and goes on to do many more sexually charged films with Suryakanth, which catapults her into stardom. She gains many male fans and, in a short time, becomes immensely rich and popular as a sex symbol.

Suryakanth's younger brother Ramakanth is a fanboy of Silk and starts to befriend her. Silk develops a liking for him after she realizes that he is the first man who loves her for more than just her body and sex appeal. Silk visits her hometown with Ramakanth and is happy to see the crowd gathering around to see her, but is left heartbroken as her mother slams the door on her face. At an awards ceremony Silk is praised for her performance but is insulted by Suryakanth who tells her that she is nothing more than everyone's "dirty secret". Hurt by his remarks, Silk announces that she will continue to make her "dirty pictures" and that she has no qualms about doing so. She begins to spend more time with Ramakanth and becomes the focus of tabloid gossip after noted journalist Naila criticizes Silk for having a romantic relationship with both brothers. To avoid a scandal and also to get revenge, Suryakanth drops Silk from his forthcoming films, forcing her to work with smaller, unknown filmmakers. She loses interest in her work and begins to feel threatened by a younger aspiring actress, Shakeela. During a dance challenge, she tries to outshine Shakeela by dancing more and more erotically and finally intentionally trips Shakeela, much to the embarrassment of Ramakanth who had been planning to introduce Silk to his parents as a prospective bride. Ramakanth then decides to end their relationship. Silk says she has no shame about what she is, and drives away Ramakanth. Silk also walks out from a film set when the director calls her out for being inattentive at the shoot. The film transitions 2 months after the incident. To ease her heartbreak and the rejection from her mother, Silk, who had already been into drinking and smoking, goes full-fledged turns to alcohol and chain smoking. She shows symptoms of depression. She also gains weight, causing her to lose her status as a sex symbol. Silk approaches Selva Ganesh with an offer to produce a film together. Ultimately, the audience and industry lost interest in her, and the film fails. On the other hand, Abraham directs a film starring himself, containing commercial eroticism and that turns out to be a huge hit. He feels that he has finally proven to Silk (and himself) that he has defeated Silk. But Abraham takes a liking towards Silk even though he claims that he hate her. Having lost her fame and fortune, Silk has accumulated so much debt that she approaches a small-time filmmaker, willing to take on any role. She is shocked to find that he wants her to do a pornographic film, and she refuses. He intoxicates her with alcohol and starts filming, without her permission. The place is raided by the police but Silk manages to escape. She has several visions of her past and encounters Rathnamma's shop on the way and tries to hide from being seen by her. Completely heartbroken and inundated with substance abuse, she reaches her house and cries bitterly.

Abraham finds himself falling in love with Silk, even though he denies it at first, as he struggles with this moral dilemma. He goes to Silk's hometown and convinces her mother to accompany him to visit her. He tries to call Silk over phone but she doesn't pick up. He brings Silk's mother to Madras and decides to take her to Silk the next morning. When he finally got Silk on phone, Abraham becomes alarmed when she asks him to bid farewell to everyone for her. He rushes to her house and finds her lying in bed dead from a sleeping pill overdose, along with a suicide note written by her.

A tearful Abraham and Silk's mother cremates Silk's body. The film ends with Abraham's narration, examining the life that Silk has led, and he questions whether it was her or her life that was right or wrong. He also thinks that Silk must be right now creating an uproar in the other world as well, because that is her nature.

Cast 
 Vidya Balan as Reshma / Silk (based on Silk Smitha), a rebellious and independent woman. She runs away from her rural home at a young age to nurture her dream of becoming an actress. She is uninhibited in expressing her sexuality.
 Emraan Hashmi as Abraham (loosely based on Balu Mahendra), a director and the narrator of the film. He dreams of making critically acclaimed films. He initially hates Silk and her over-sexualisation of the film industry.
 Naseeruddin Shah as Suryakanth (loosely based on Gemini Ganesan), an aging and a flamboyant South Indian superstar. He is involved in extramarital relationships and has a secret affair with the much younger Silk.
 Tusshar Kapoor as Ramakanth, Suryakant's brother and a writer for one of his forthcoming films. He is attracted to Silk but, unlike his brother, is empathetic towards her.
 Anju Mahendru as Naila, a journalist who writes sensationalist articles about Silk but secretively admires her courage.
 Neha Bam as Silk's mother
 Arya Banerjee as Shakeela, an up-and-coming young actress who compares herself to Silk
 Rajesh Sharma as Selva Ganesh / Keedadas, the producer of most of Silk's films
 Imran Hasnee as Vijayan, filmmaker 
 Mangal Kenkre as Ratnamma, a confidante of Silk.
 Vikas Shrivastav as Sudhir, casting director
 Mohit Sinha as Manorma
 Shivani Tanksale as Raadhika
 Lavin Gothi as a Fanboy of Silk

Production

Development 
Ekta Kapoor launched the film with director Milan Luthria soon after their collaboration Once Upon a Time in Mumbaai became a hit. She said that The Dirty Picture is my picture it shows how life had been to me
would be India's answer to the Academy Award-nominated film Boogie Nights. Later in a press conference, Kapoor clarified that neither of Balaji's forthcoming films, Ragini MMS nor The Dirty Picture, were "porn films" as they had been made out to be.

Kapoor has gone on record to add, "I would be surprised if I don't get unbelievable critical acclaim for The Dirty Picture and a national award for my actress, Vidya Balan. The film has one of the most well-written scripts I have come across and a lot of youngsters in my office have looked at it with great admiration." She pointed out that the purpose of the film was neither to justify nor criticise Smitha's life but for the audience to live her life. Additionally, all actors, including Balan and Shah attended workshops for almost two months before filming began, to familiarise themselves with the body language of their characters.

When screenwriter Rajat Aroraa initially started working, taking cues from producer Kapoor, the scope of the film was much smaller, primarily looking back to the soft-pornography scene of the 1980s. As work progressed, the scope gradually widened to include the controversial romances of Smitha through a fictionalised biopic. While researching for the film, director Luthria and screenwriter Aroraa found little material in magazines of that period, as "women like Silk Smitha were often ignored by film magazines, except for gossip column mentions". Thus they derived many of the details of her life from anecdotes and party gossips, and then fictionalised them. Apart from depicting the pomp of the Telugu/Tamil film industry, the screenplay takes up issues such as money management by actors, "their string of broken relationships", and the way they "led lonely lives and met with tragic ends". For inspiration, instead of looking at South Indian films of the period, the team turned to the work of mainstream Bollywood directors like Manmohan Desai, Vijay Anand, Raj Kapoor, Feroz Khan and G.P. Sippy. To put the global soft-porn industry in context, the team looked into Boogie Nights (1997) and The People vs. Larry Flynt (1996). The final script became a "fictionalised, women-oriented, generalised perspective on the 1980s film industry".

Casting 
After initial talks with actresses Kangana Ranaut and Bipasha Basu fell through, Vidya Balan was offered the lead role. When Balan was narrated the script and shown sketches of what she needed to wear for the portrayal, she felt uncomfortable. Luthria added, "We couldn't have found anyone better than Vidya for this role. It's a casting that very few would think is viable because it is going to be nothing like Vidya has done before. But I am confident she will push the envelope as far as she can".

Regarding the criticism that Balan's character might evoke, Luthria clarified, "I wanted Vidya to know that what she's doing is not crass or crude but can be shown aesthetically in a sensual manner with a touch of class. What her character does, is not cheap." As a reference point, he also asked Balan to study 'similar themed' films such as Burlesque and Chicago. Balan also underwent salsa training to fine-tune herself with Smitha's languid body language.

Next, Naseeruddin Shah was cast as an ageing South Indian superstar with "hideous wigs, dark glasses and painted-on mustaches". He performed a "fast dance number" in the film, a full 22 years after he last did it in the song "Tirchi Topiwale" from Tridev (1989). Regarding his character, Ekta Kapoor stated, "This role requires him to play to the gallery, provoke claps, laughs, and whistles and I know he can pull it off because Naseer is the Shah of all actors." Luthria added, "Expect a man who unabashedly enjoys the flesh of women".

Tusshar Kapoor and Emraan Hashmi were next cast in lead roles. While it was known that Tusshar Kapoor would play the role of a script-writer and Smitha's love interest, the nature of Hashmi's role was unknown for a while. The casting received praise from trade pundits, with Taran Adarsh commenting, "Known for engaging in interesting and unconventional casting in all its previous releases, Balaji has again tackled the unheard of, by casting Emraan Hashmi and Vidya Balan – two of the most successful stars of today – opposite each other in The Dirty Picture. The perfect combination of mass and class promises to make this controversial film yet another winner from the Balaji stable."

Filming 
Filming was to begin on 21 May 2011: a week after the release of Kapoor's Ragini MMS. But due to production delays, it began a week later. Balan, a religious person, organised a puja on the sets before principal photography began.

The first leg of filming took place at Mumbai's Film City where an elaborate set re-creating Chennai (then Madras) of the 80s was set up. The second schedule was shot in Ramoji Film City in Hyderabad. The song "Ishq Sufiyana" was shot at Bidar fort in Bidar, Karnataka. Filming was completed in September, before venturing into post-production, ahead of the December release.

Director Luthria wanted to depict a sense of discomfort between the two lead characters, Balan and Hashmi, a "meeting of two completely different worlds". So he didn't allow them to interact and get comfortable with each other during film workshops ahead of the shoot. Since he considered them "the unlikeliest pair to come together", he brought them together right into the shoot filming an important scene, where they had to insult each other. Though he was initially anxious, it all turned out well and he was surprised by the resulting chemistry.

Marketing 

The first look of The Dirty Picture and a short teaser were launched online on 26 August 2011. The enthusiastic response even prompted its producers to consider a sequel. The film's trailer on YouTube got over 500,000 hits in one day and one million hits in two days. Meanwhile, the theatrical trailer was launched on 30 August at a single screen cinema in Bandra. The space was especially decorated to recreate the retro era. Since the film is set in the 1980s, a time when multiplexes did not exist, the producers thought it would be fitting to show the première on a single screen. The lead stars created publicity by organising a promotional campaign in the festival of Mithibai College on 30 November.

As a part of the film promotion, actors Vidya Balan, Tusshar Kapoor and Emraan Hashmi made appearances on the popular TV show Bigg Boss aired on Colors on 26 November 2011. Balan also entered the house to spend some time with the housemates and present a red sari to Sunny Leone, as a present. On 27 November 2011, Balan and Hashmi made guest appearances on a special episode of the TV series Bade Achhe Lagte Hain. Balan shook leg to the song, "Ooh La La" with Saakshi Tanwar, the female lead actress of the show.

Music

T-Series acquired the music rights for The Dirty Picture. Vishal–Shekhar composed four tracks and Rajat Arora penned the lyrics for them. The first of the four tracks, "Ooh La La," sung by Shreya Ghoshal and Bappi Lahiri was released on the internet on 19 October 2011. "Ooh La La" was featured in Fox American sitcom television series New Girl episode "Big Mama P". and was used in some regional films, including in Race Gurram. The Tamil song "Nakka Mukka" was featured in the film.

Joginder Tuteja of Bollywood Hungama gave the music an overall rating of 4/5 saying, "Music of The Dirty Picture takes the expected route and delivers what it promised" and chose Ooh La La and Ishq Sufiyana as picks from the album. Sukanya Verma of Rediff.com gave the album a rating of 2 and a half out of 5, and said the opening track of The Dirty Picture is the album's only star.

Track list

Release
The film released worldwide on 2 December 2011, coinciding with the 51st birth anniversary of South Indian film siren Silk Smitha. Nationally, the film released on 1766 screens and on 120 screens abroad.

Reception

Critical response
Upon release, the film received positive reviews from critics, with Balan's performance receiving widespread critical acclaim. The Times of India gave 4 out of 5 stars, concluding that "The Dirty Picture is definitely not only your film for the week, but is a seminal work that will be studied in feminist discourses." Komal Nahta of Koimoi.com gave 4 out of 5 stars and said, "The Dirty Picture is a wonderful film and will do extraordinary business." Kaveree Bamzai of India Today gave 4 out of 5 stars and extolled Balan's performance, calling it "riveting". Rajeev Masand of CNN-IBN gave 3 stars out of 5, commenting "Despite the film’s shortcomings, you go the distance for Vidya Balan, who’s riveting as Silk. She plays the part with gusto – it’s a rare performance, one that’s this brave and uninhibited. Vidya pushes the envelope in the way she bares herself both physically and emotionally...Vidya’s lack of vanity and complete surrender to her craft reinforces why she’s miles ahead of her contemporaries."

Dainik Bhaskar gave the film 3 and half stars out of 5, concluding, "Overall, a big thumbs up to The Dirty Picture, which is in its truest meaning, an entertainer. Highly recommended!" Raja Sen from Rediff.com gave 3.5 out of 5 stars and said "The Dirty Picture forsakes much potential nuance in its urge to please crowds but is still far more engaging than most Bollywood produce." Sukanya Verma of Rediff.com gave 3 out of 5 stars, highlighting that "In terms of creativity, it's a middling effort. But where bravado is concerned, The Dirty Picture kicks ass by virtue of three very strong reasons: Vidya Balan. Vidya Balan. Vidya Balan." Kunal Guha of Yahoo! India gave the movie 3 stars out of 5, and said, "Clearly, Rajat Aroraa's winning dialogues will make you sit up and say, "She [Balan] didn't just say that?!" Sudhish Kamath of The Hindu praised Balan's performance saying "This is the single-most boldest performance by a woman in the history of Indian cinema...Vidya apparently put on 12 kilos for this film and they all show. It needs some amount of guts and sass to pull it off and she sizzles in this role tailor-made to show off her acting chops."

Box office
The Dirty Picture opened strong, with 60–65% collections on average at multiplexes and had the 5th biggest opening of 2011. The opening was best in and around the Maharashtra area, with 80% and 75% openings respectively.

India
Due to a public holiday on Tuesday owing to Muharram celebrations, collection jumped to  nett, and hence taking the total 5 days collection to  nett.

The Dirty Picture sustained well in the second week. The film grossed  nett on its second Friday while  nett on Saturday, with major collections coming from Maharashtra area. It collected  nett on its second weekend. 25 weeks after its release, The Dirty Picture continued to have a successful run in theaters; the film celebrated its silver jubilee at Relief Cinema in Ahmedabad, Gujarat. The Dirty Picture was highest grossing Bollywood film with an 'A' (Adults only) certificate in India, before the record was broken by Grand Masti in 2013.

Other territories
Internationally, the film released in the UAE, UK, Canada, United States, Mauritius, Malaysia, Singapore, Kenya, Tanzania, Indonesia, South Africa, Australia, New Zealand, Fiji and Hong Kong. In UAE, on Thursday alone, the film grossed .

Home media
The Indian television premiere of The Dirty Picture was set to be telecast on SET on 22 April 2012 at 12 pm and 8 pm IST. The Nagpur bench of the Bombay High Court allowed the TV channel to go ahead with the scheduled telecast after the Central Board of Film Certification had cleared the film with 56 cuts, 36 of which were done by the producers, while other cuts were suggested by the Certification Board. It had to go through these cuts as the telecast of an adult-rated film during prime time in India is a violation of the Cable TV Network Rules, 1994 and the Cable TV Networks (Regulation) Act, 1995. Following this process, Sony Entertainment Television promoted the scheduled telecast. However, on the scheduled day, the film was not telecast, with the channel putting up a message stating, "For unavoidable reasons we regret to inform you that The Dirty Picture will not be telecast today. Any inconvenience caused is deeply regretted." The Information and Broadcast Ministry informed the TV channel that it can air the film only after prime time: post 11 pm.

Accolades

The Dirty Picture received numerous awards and nominations from major award shows in India and abroad. The majority of these were won by Vidya Balan in the Best Actress category for her performance. The other achievements include those of costume design, dialogue, make-up, playback singing and choreography.

References

External links

 
 
 

2011 biographical drama films
2010s erotic drama films
Indian erotic drama films
2011 films
Films scored by Vishal–Shekhar
2010s Hindi-language films
Indian biographical drama films
Films about women in India
Films set in the 1980s
Films set in Tamil Nadu
Films shot at Ramoji Film City
Films about actors
Films about filmmaking
Films that won the Best Costume Design National Film Award
Films that won the National Film Award for Best Make-up
Films featuring a Best Actress National Award-winning performance
Balaji Motion Pictures films
Hindi films remade in other languages
Films about pornography
Indian nonlinear narrative films
Erotic musical films
Censored films
Films directed by Milan Luthria
2011 drama films
Biographical films about actors